Bath Springs is an unincorporated community in Decatur County, Tennessee, United States.

References

Unincorporated communities in Decatur County, Tennessee
Unincorporated communities in Tennessee